Silvestri Alantine alias Uthayan is a Sri Lankan politician. He was a member of the Sri Lankan Parliament from Jaffna District as a member of the paramilitary  Eelam People's Democratic Party. However, he contested under the symbol of United People's Freedom Alliance

References

Members of the 14th Parliament of Sri Lanka
United People's Freedom Alliance politicians
1972 births
Living people